The golden shiner virus is an aquatic virus that infects a bait fish known as the golden shiner and to a lesser extent, aquatic animals like crustaceans and molluscs. About 6 virus species have been identified in this genus since the late 1970s. It causes death through a hemorrhagic shock. Symptoms include bleeding from the back eyes and the head. The virus is 70 nm in diameter and replicates best at 20-30 degrees Celsius. The virus has properties similar to those of the pancreatic necrosis virus. This could mean that golden shiners are more susceptible in the summer.

Virus genome 
The genome is packed into the virus core and is encased in a double layered icosahedral capsid that is similar to the orthoreovirus capsid. This genome has 11 segments like the rotaviruses. Each genome has a 5' end motif of (GUUAUU) and (UUCAUC) motif at the 3' end. There are 11 open reading frames. Segments 1-3 encode viral proteins (VP)1-3, segments 4,7,8,9 and 11 code for non-structural proteins, segments 6 and 10 are for coding outer-capsid proteins. Lastly, segment 5 encodes an enzyme protein NTPase.

References

 Attoui, H., Fang, Q., Jaafar, F.M., Cantaloube, J., Biagini, P., de Micco, P. & de Lamballerie, X. 2002, "Common evolutionary origin of aquareoviruses and orthoreoviruses revealed by genome characterization of Golden shiner reovirus, Grass carp reovirus, Striped bass reovirus and golden ide reovirus (genus Aquareovirus, family Reoviridae)", Journal of General Virology, vol. 83, no. 8, pp. 1941–1951.
 Schwedler, T. & Plumb, J. 1982, "In vitro growth kinetics and thermostability of the golden shiner virus", Journal of Wildlife Diseases, vol. 18, no. 4, pp. 441–446.

External links
 A table

Reoviruses